Angelo Fabroni (September 25, 1732September 22, 1803) was an Italian biographer and historian.

Biographie 
Angelo Fabroni was born at Marradi in Tuscany to Alessandro and Giacinta Fabroni, of a banking family formerly of great fortune. After studying with tutors and at Faenza, in 1750 he entered the Collegio Bandinelli in Rome, founded for the education of young Tuscans. His father having died that year, Piero Francesco Foggini took an interest in the young man's education. Fabroni became a priest.

On the conclusion of his studies he continued his stay in Rome, and having been introduced to the celebrated Jansenist historian, Giovanni Gaetano Bottari, the librarian of the Corsini, he translated some meditative works of Pasquier Quesnel and received from Bottari a canonry at Santa Maria in Trastevere. With Bottari's aid he presented a polished Latin life of Pope Clement XII Corsini, for which Cardinal Corsini defrayed the printing costs and made a handsome present to its author. Some time after this Fabroni was chosen to preach a Latin discourse in the pontifical chapel before Benedict XIV, with whom he made such a favorable impression that the pontiff settled on him an annuity, in the possession of which Fabroni was able to devote his whole time to study. Fabroni was asked to deliver the funeral oration in 1766 for James Stuart, the "Old Pretender" to the throne of Great Britain. He was intimate with Leopold Peter, Grand Duke of Tuscany, who appointed him prior of the Basilica of San Lorenzo, Florence (1767); two years later, Fabroni took leave to pursue promises of preferment at Rome, made by Pope Clement XIV Ganganelli, in which he was disappointed.

He was at work on the biographical dictionary of Italian men of letters for which he is remembered; the first volume was published in 1766, and was met with criticism, for the Jesuits disliked him on account of his Jansenist views. Besides his other literary labors he began at Pisa in 1771 a literary journal, Giornale de' letterati, which he continued till 1796, by which time 102 fascicles had appeared, many from his own pen. About 1772, funded by the Grand Duke, he made a journey to Paris, where he formed the acquaintance of Condorcet, Diderot, d'Alembert, Rousseau and most of the other Encyclopédisteswhom he found to be leaders of impietyand other eminent Frenchmen of the day. He also spent four months in London, of which he also disapproved, where Benjamin Franklin fruitlessly urged him to go to America. He returned to Tuscany in 1773. Later he corresponded with Leopold II, Holy Roman Emperor. He died in retirement among the Carthusians at Pisa.

His principal works were: Vitae Italorum doctrina excellentium qui in saeculis XVII. et XVIII. floruerunt (20 vols., Pisa, 1778-1799, 1804-1805); Laurentii Medicei Magnifici Vita (2 vols., Pisa, 1784), which served as a basis for William Roscoe's Life of Lorenzo de' Medici; Leonis X pontificis maximi Vita (Pisa, 1797); and Elogi di Dante Alighieri, di Angelo Poliziano, di Lodovico Ariosto, e di Torquato Tasso (Parma, 1800).

Notes

References

 

1732 births
1803 deaths
People from Marradi
Italian biographers
Male biographers
Italian male non-fiction writers